

People 

Peli is an Italian and Hebrew surname. Notable people with the surname include:

 Alexander Peli (1915-2007), Ukrainian encyclopedist
 Bracha Peli (1892-1986), Israeli publisher
 Giora Peli (1936-2020), Israeli chess master
 Lorenzo Peli (born 2000), Italian football player
 Oren Peli (born 1970), American-Israeli film director
 Pinchas Hacohen Peli (1930-1989), Israeli rabbi

Other uses 

 Peli, a brand name deployed by Pelican Products within Europe